Conservation medicine is an emerging, interdisciplinary field that studies the relationship between human and animal health and environmental conditions. It is also known as ecological medicine, environmental medicine, or medical geology.

The environmental causes of health problems are complex, global, and poorly understood. Conservation medicine practitioners form multidisciplinary teams to tackle these issues. Teams may involve physicians and veterinarians working alongside researchers and clinicians from diverse disciplines, including microbiologists, pathologists, landscape analysts, marine biologists, toxicologists, epidemiologists, climate biologists, anthropologists, economists, and political scientists.

Clinical areas include HIV, Lyme disease, severe acute respiratory syndrome (SARS), avian influenza, West Nile virus, malaria, Nipah virus, and other emerging infectious diseases.

The term conservation medicine was first used in the mid-1990s, and represents a significant development in both medicine and environmentalism. While the hands-on process in individual cases is complicated, the underlying concept is quite intuitive, namely, that human health, wildlife health, and ecosystem health are all related. The threat of zoonotic diseases that travel to humans from animals is central. For example, burning huge areas of forest to make way for farmland may displace a wild animal species, which then infects a domesticated animal. The domesticated animal then enters the human food chain and infects people, and a new health threat emerges. Conventional approaches to the environment, animal and human health rarely examine these connections.  In conservation medicine, such relationships are fundamental. Professionals from the many disciplines involved necessarily work closely together.

Social impact

Looking at the environment and health together, conservation medicine has the potential to effect rapid change in public opinion on complex societal issues, by making the distant and ill-defined, local and pressing. For instance, global warming may vaguely define long-term impacts, but an immediate effect may be a relatively slight rise in air temperature. This in turn raises the flight ceiling for temperature-sensitive mosquitoes, allowing them to feed on higher flying migratory birds than usual, which in turn may carry a disease from one country or continent to another.

Likewise, the broad topic of suburban sprawl is made more relevant when seen in terms of the immediate imbalance it brings to rural ecosystems, which increases population densities and forces humans into closer contact with animals (like rodents), increasing the risk of new cross-species diseases. When tied to actual cases (such as SARS or HIV/AIDS), this holistic outlook resonates more powerfully with the public than more abstract explanations.

See also 
One Health
Zoonosis
Tropical medicine
Emergent virus
Environmentalism

References 

 
 
 
 Motavalli, Jim. "Too Darn Hot Global Warming Accelerates the Spread of Disease", E—The Environmental Magazine, November/December 2004.
 Moss, Doug. "E WORD: Conservation Health", E—The Environmental Magazine, November/December 2004.
Pokras MA, Kneeland MK (2009) Lead uptake and effects across species lines: a conservation medicine approach. In Ingestion of lead from spent ammunition: implications for wildlife and humans (eds RT Watson, M Fuller, M Pokras, WG Hunt), pp. 7–22. Boise, ID: The Peregrine Fund.

Veterinary medicine